The 20917/20918 Indore - Puri Humsafar Express is a superfast express train of the Indian Railways connecting  in Madhya Pradesh and  in Odisha. It is currently being operated with 20917/20918 train numbers on a weekly basis.

Coach Composition 
The train is completely 3-tier AC sleeper designed by Indian Railways with features of LED screen display to show information about stations, train speed etc. and will have announcement system as well, Vending machines for tea, coffee and milk, Bio toilets in compartments as well as CCTV cameras.

Service

The 20917/Indore - Puri Humsafar Express has an average speed of 52 km/hr and covers 1602 km in 30 hrs 45 mins.

The 20918/Puri - Indore Humsafar Express has an average speed of 45 km/hr and covers 1602 km in 35 hrs 30 mins.

Route & Halts 

The important halts of the train are :

Schedule

Rake Sharing 

The train shares its rake with 20915/20916 Lingampalli - Indore Humsafar Express.

Traction

Both trains are hauled by a WAP 5 (HOG) equipped locomotive of Vadodara Loco Shed on its entire journey.

See also
 Humsafar Express

References

External links 
 19317/Indore - Puri Humsafar Express
 19318/Puri - Indore Humsafar Express

Humsafar Express trains
Transport in Indore
Transport in Puri
Rail transport in Chhattisgarh
Rail transport in Madhya Pradesh
Rail transport in Odisha
Railway services introduced in 2018